Main Library may refer to the following libraries:

Main Library (Columbus, Ohio)
Main Library (Erie, Pennsylvania)
Main Library (San Francisco)
Main Library (University of Illinois at Urbana–Champaign)